Steve Adubato, Ph.D. (born October 7, 1957) is a television broadcaster, author, motivational speaker, leadership and communication coach, syndicated columnist and university lecturer.  In the mid 1980s he was New Jersey's youngest state legislator in the New Jersey General Assembly at age 26. Adubato holds a doctorate from Rutgers University in the field of mass media and communication. He is the author of four books.

Early life and education
Adubato, born in and a native of Newark, he graduated from Essex Catholic High School, which he described as having "high academic standards despite being in one of the worst sections of the city". He earned his master's degree from Rutgers and later a Doctor of Philosophy degree in mass communication from Rutgers. He was elected to the New Jersey General Assembly in 1984 with the support of his father, Steve Adubato Sr., a New Jersey Democratic politician, making him New Jersey’s youngest state legislator at the age of 26. However, he lost re-election in 1985, thus ending his political career.

Career
Steve Adubato is a broadcaster with the PBS affiliates in the New York/New Jersey/Philadelphia region who holds a PhD from Rutgers in the field of mass communication and a Masters from the Eagleton Institute of Politics at Rutgers. He is also a "distinguished visiting professor" at Seton Hall University, Rowan University and has lectured at Rutgers, NJIT as well as NYU, Montclair State University, Caldwell University and West Point.  His academic research and writing has focused on the role of the media in American society and the current state of journalism. More recently, Adubato's work has focused on the study of leadership which us the topic of his most recent book "Lessons in Leadership". He also conducts executive coaching and leadership development seminars for  a variety of corporations and organizations through his firm Stand & Deliver.

In 1994, Adubato along with a group of broadcasting entrepreneurs founded the Caucus Educational Corporation (CEC), to produce public affairs programs. The company had produced content on New Jersey public affairs for websites such as NJ.com, BestofNJ.com, and others. In 2011, after NJN was privatized, the CEC produced programs for its successor, NJTV along with its sister station, WNET. Since 2011, Adubato remains the host of three of the four CEC produced programs, including Caucus New Jersey with Steve Adubato, State of Affairs and One on One with Steve Adubato, much of which is aired on NJTV, WNET, along with FiOS1 New Jersey (which later closed in 2019), WHYY-TV and on Classical Station WQXR-FM. New Jersey Capital Report ended its run in 2017 and was replaced with State of Affairs by March 2017. In addition to hosting the aforementioned programs, he also appeared on the Today Show, CNN, FOX News and WNYW as a media and political analyst. Adubato also appears regularly on New York City talk radio stations WABC-AM 770 and  WNYM AM 970 as well as Sirius XM Satellite Radio.

Stand & Deliver
In 1999, Adubato founded a not-for-profit version of his firm called Stand & Deliver: Communication Tools for Tomorrow's Leaders. The program provides communication and leadership skills training to young people in the greater Newark, New Jersey, area. Annually, the program provides over 500 young adults with the tools they need to become better citizens and to more effectively compete for and succeed in future employment.

Adubato is the president of Stand & Deliver, a professional development and executive coaching program he created to help professionals improve as leaders. He conducts communication workshops, seminars and keynote speeches on such topics as branding, presentation skills, leadership and team building, customer service and dealing with the media.

Books
Adubato is the author of the non-fiction book Speak from the Heart – Be Yourself and Get Results published by Simon & Schuster. It was featured in Fortune magazine. He also wrote Make the Connection – Improve Your Communication at Work and at Home (Rutgers University Press) and What Were They Thinking? Crisis Communication: The Good, the Bad and the Totally Clueless which examines highly publicized and often controversial public relations and media mishaps. His fourth book, YOU Are the Brand! provides tips, strategies and tools aimed at helping people succeed. His fifth book, titled Lessons in Leadership, teaches readers to be self-aware, empathetic, and more effective leaders at work and at home. His sixth book, titled Lessons in Leadership 2.0: The Tough Stuff is expected in 2023.

Accolades
He has received four Emmy Awards. In 1995, 2000 and again in 2001, the Mid-Atlantic Chapter of the National Academy of Television Arts and Sciences presented Adubato with Emmy Awards in the category of "Best Host".

See also

Steve Adubato Sr., Adubato's father
List of American print journalists
List of people from Montclair, New Jersey
List of non-fiction writers
List of Rutgers University people
List of television presenters

References

External links

 

1957 births
20th-century American politicians
21st-century scholars
American columnists
American motivational speakers
American motivational writers
American political journalists
American radio journalists
Essex Catholic High School alumni
News & Documentary Emmy Award winners
Journalists from New Jersey
Living people
Montclair State University faculty
Democratic Party members of the New Jersey General Assembly
People from Montclair, New Jersey
Politicians from Newark, New Jersey
PBS people
Radio personalities from New Jersey
Rutgers University alumni
Rutgers University faculty
Writers from New Jersey
Television anchors from New York City